Pseudotritonia quadrangularis is a species of sea slug, an aeolid nudibranch, a shell-less marine gastropod mollusk in the family Charcotiidae.

Distribution 
Pseudotritionia quadrangularis are found in Antarctic waters, the Antarctic peninsula, and other nearby islands.

References 

Fauna of Antarctica
Charcotiidae
Gastropods described in 1912